Woodland Cemetery and Arboretum (200 acres), located at 118 Woodland Avenue, Dayton, Ohio, is one of the oldest garden cemeteries in the United States.

Woodland was incorporated in 1842 by John Whitten Van Cleve, the first male child born in Dayton. He was the son of Benjamin Van Cleve and Mary Whitten Van Cleve. Over 3,000 trees and 165 specimens of native Midwestern trees and woody plants grace the rolling hills. Many of the trees are more than a century old and 9 have been designated "Ohio Champions." The highest point in Dayton is within the cemetery, and during the Great Dayton Flood of 1913, it became a place of refuge.

The Romanesque gateway, chapel and office, completed in 1889, are on the National Register of Historic Places.  The buildings were constructed of the stone from the original cemetery wall.  The chapel has one of the finest original Tiffany windows in the country. A mausoleum, with a rock and bronze exterior, features twenty-two varieties of imported marble and twelve large stained glass windows inspired by famous literary works. It was added in 1970.  The oldest original 105-acre section of the cemetery, known as "Victorian," received a second designation as a historic district on the National Register of Historic Places in 2011.

A receiving vault large enough to contain 12 crypts was built in 1847 by Joseph Wuichert, who was said to be Dayton's premier stonemason. Throughout the 19th century it was used for temporary storage when burials were delayed due to bad weather or for other reasons (for example, refer to the article below on Levi and Matilda Stanley). Located near the main entrance to the cemetery and across from the mausoleum, it is constructed of giant limestone slabs and was designed as a replica of the Egyptian-style temple of Thebes and Karnak. It was unused for nearly 100 years but the exterior was restored in 2008 to its original condition.

Notable burials

The monuments, ranging from rugged boulders to Greek statues and temples, memorialize the lives of people who helped shape the nation and the city. Woodland is the final resting place for more than 100,000 people, including:
 Orville and Wilbur Wright, inventors of the airplane
 Jordan Anderson, freed slave and letter writer
 John H. Balsley, inventor of the folding step-ladder
 Alice Pike Barney, artist
 Loren M. Berry, inventor of the Yellow Pages
 Erma Bombeck, humorist and writer
 Alex Campbell, professional golfer of early 20th century
 Mrs. Leslie Carter, actress
 William Charch, DuPont Chemist, inventor of moistureproof cellophane for food packaging.
 Charlotte Reeve Conover, historian
 Daniel C. Cooper, surveyor and Proprietor of Dayton
 James M. Cox, newspaper publisher, Governor of Ohio and Presidential candidate
 Edward A. Deeds, engineer, inventor and industrialist
 Paul Laurence Dunbar, poet
 John Glossinger, popularized the Oh Henry! candy bar
 Charles Herby, architect
 Marj Heyduck, Dayton Daily News columnist and editor
 George P. Huffman, industrialist (Huffy Bicycles)
 Andrew Iddings, inventor of the stereoptic (3-D) camera.
 Charles F. Kettering, inventor
 Earl Kiser, bicyclist and auto racer, "Little Dayton Demon"
 L. L. Langstroth, father of American beekeeping
 Leroy Tate Marshall, US representative
 George Mead, industrialist (Mead Paper)
 John H. Patterson, industrialist (NCR)
 James Ritty, inventor of the cash register
 James Findlay Schenck, Rear Admiral, United States Navy
 Robert Cumming Schenck, Civil War General, member of US Congress and Ambassador to Brazil and United Kingdom
 Levi and Matilda Stanley, "King and Queen" of the Gypsies
 John W. Stoddard built the Stoddard-Dayton automobile
 Gertrude Strohm, author, compiler, game designer
 Stephen W. Thompson, World War I aviator
 Clement Vallandigham Congressman and Copperhead leader
 David Ziegler, first mayor of Cincinnati, Ohio
 Milton Wright, father of aviation pioneers Wilbur Wright and Orville Wright, and a bishop of the Church of the United Brethren in Christ.

See also 
 List of cemeteries in the United States
 List of botanical gardens and arboretums in the United States
 National Register of Historic Places listings in Dayton, Ohio

References

External links

 Woodland Cemetery and Arboretum
 
 Woodland Cemetery Association, 1875
 National Register nomination form

Arboreta in Ohio
Cemeteries in Montgomery County, Ohio
Cemeteries on the National Register of Historic Places in Ohio
Botanical gardens in Ohio
Geography of Dayton, Ohio
Protected areas of Montgomery County, Ohio
National Register of Historic Places in Montgomery County, Ohio
Tourist attractions in Dayton, Ohio
Parks on the National Register of Historic Places in Ohio
Cemeteries in Dayton, Ohio
Rural cemeteries